Pasko Rakic is a Yugoslav-born American neuroscientist, who presently works in the Yale School of Medicine Department of Neuroscience in New Haven, Connecticut.  His main research interest is in the development and evolution of the human brain. He was the founder and served as Chairman of the Department of Neurobiology at Yale, and was founder and Director of the  Kavli Institute for Neuroscience.  He is best known for elucidating the mechanisms involved in development and evolution of the cerebral cortex. In 2008, Rakic shared the inaugural Kavli Prize in Neuroscience. He is currently the Dorys McConell Duberg Professor of Neuroscience, leads an active research laboratory, and serves on Advisory Boards and Scientific Councils of a number of Institutions and Research Foundations.

Early life and education
Rakic was born on May 15, 1933, in Ruma (formerly Kingdom of Yugoslavia). His father, Toma Rakić, was Croatian, originally from Pula (Istria, at that time part of Italy), but emigrated to Yugoslavia, where in the town of Novi Sad (Bačka) he studied to become an accountant and tax official. His mother, Juliana Todorić, of Serbian and Slovakian descent was born in Dubrovnik (Dalmatia) and moved to Ruma, where they met and got married in 1929.

Due to the nature of his father's job as Director of Regional Tax Services, the family moved to different towns every few years. Finally, their daughter, Vera, and son, Pasko, completed Gimnasium (High School) in the town of Sremska Mitrovica. Vera eventually graduated in mathematics from Belgrade University, and Pasko obtained his medical degree (MD) from the University of Belgrade School of Medicine, where he embarked on a career as a neurosurgeon.

His research career began in 1962, with a Fulbright Fellowship at Harvard University in Boston, MA, where he met professor Paul Yakovlev, who introduced him to the joy of studying human brain development, which inspired him to abandon neurosurgery. In 1966, he returned to Belgrade and obtained his graduate degree in Developmental Biology and Genetics in 1969.  During work on his doctoral thesis, Rakic made his first significant discovery that was internationally recognized.

He then accepted a faculty position at Harvard Medical School, where he worked and taught for eight years. In 1978, he was recruited by George Palade to Yale University, where he founded and served as Chair of the Department of Neurobiology and the director of the Kavli Institute for Neuroscience until 2015, when he returned to work full-time on his research projects, funded by US Public Health Services and various private foundations. He was president of the Society for Neuroscience from 1995 to 1996.

Research
Rakic is known for his studies of the development and evolution of the brain.  More specifically, he has discovered and formulated basic cellular and molecular mechanisms of proliferation and migration of neurons in the cerebral cortex, the brain's outer layer, which plays a key role in cognition and human exceptional mental capacities.

According to Nature Medicine, his first experiments at Harvard required an especially large research grant, that enabled exposure of non-human primate rhesus monkeys to so much radioactive thymidine that manufacturers had to retool their entire production system to provide it. Rakic injected the monkeys' fetuses with radioactive thymidine at a particular time after conception. Only replicating cells took up the radioactive label, which enabled Rakic to trace the lineages of brain cells as they were created. He and his team then sliced the brain of each monkey into 7,000 sections, which were stored in Rakic's collection for the benefit of future researchers. Because he used a radiolabel that decays slowly, the slides should be useful for years, and have so far led to more than 24 papers. This material has also provided evidence that contributed one of the significant tenets of Neuroscience, that neurons of the cerebral cortex last for the entire lifespan and are irreplaceable.
This and other material, such as tissue from monkeys of different age, are available in MacBrainResource.

Rakic discovered the early commitment of newborn neurons to their laminar, radial and areal fates and proposed differential cell adhesion as the basic mechanism for their surface-mediating migration along transient radial glial scaffolding. These studies led him to postulate the "radial unit hypothesis" and "protomap" hypotheses of cortical development and evolution that provide the framework for understanding basic principles of normal and pathological development of the human brain.
These concept were further elaborated in his paper published in the journal Neuron in 2013.

Rakic also provided direct cellular evidence for the competitive interactions among binocular visual connections before birth,  and showed that axons, synapses and neurotransmitter receptors are overproduced before declining to the adult levels by a process of competitive selective elimination.

Rakic is also known for failing to identify adult neurogenesis in the primate cerebral cortex.

Honors and awards

 Grass Foundation Award, 1985
 Karl Spencer Lashley Award, American Philosophical Society, 1986
 Francois I Medal, College de France, 1986
 Kreig Cortical Discoverer Award, 1989
 Marta Philipson Award, Stockholm 2000
 Pasarow Foundation Award, 2001
 Fyssen International Science Prize, 1992
 F.O. Schmitt Medal, 1992
 Weinstein-Goldenson Award (United Cerebral Palsy Foundation) 1994;
 Henry Gray Award, AAA, 1996
 Bristol-Myers Squibb Award, 2002
 Gerard Prize, SFN, 2002
 Inaugural Kavli Neuroscience Prize shared with T. Jessell & S. Grillner (2008)
 Krieg Lifetime Achievement Award shared with Paul Allen, 2010
 Max Cowan Award, 2013
 Sandy Palay Award, 2014
 Child Mind Institute Award, NYC, 2014
 Becker Award "Gesellschaft fuer Neuropaediatrie" 2014
 Royal Academy of Medicine (Spain), 2018
 Royal Academy of London (UK), 2018

Personal
He is married to Sandra Biller. Previously, he was married to Patricia Goldman-Rakic (née Shoer), also a neuroscientist, who died on July 31, 2003.

References

External links
Rakic Lab web page

1933 births
Living people
People from Ruma
Croats of Vojvodina
University of Belgrade Faculty of Medicine alumni
Members of the United States National Academy of Sciences
History of neuroscience
Harvard University faculty
American neuroscientists
Yale University faculty
Yugoslav emigrants to the United States
Yugoslav scientists
Members of the Norwegian Academy of Science and Letters
Foreign Members of the Royal Society
Fellows of the American Academy of Arts and Sciences
Kavli Prize laureates in Neuroscience
Members of the National Academy of Medicine
Foreign members of the Serbian Academy of Sciences and Arts